The ETC Bollywood Business Awards are presented annually by ETC Bollywood Business to award Bollywood films. This is the only award in India which judges films based on their box-office performances. The ETC Bollywood Business Awards were launched in 2010.

Categories
The awards are given in the following categories:
 Top Grossing Film of the Year
 Most Profitable Actor (Male)
 Most Profitable Actor (Female)
 Highest Grossing Director
 Highest Grossing Actor
 Highest Grossing Actress
 Most Profitable Male Debut
 Most Profitable Female Debut
 Most Profitable Actor Overseas
 Most Profitable Banner
 Most Profitable Producer
 The 100 Crore Club
 Most Successful Music Director
 Box Office Surprise Hit of the Year
 Most Successful Small Budget Film
 Best Marketed Film of the Year
 Most popular song of 2012
 Best Cinema Chain
 Most Popular Trailer
 Best Music Company

Winners

2010

Sources:

2011 
The 2011 action drama Bodyguard was awarded Top Grosser of the Year. Actor Salman Khan garnered the Most Profitable Actor (Male) award, while Shah Rukh Khan won for Most Profitable Actor (Overseas). The actress who won the Most Profitable Actor (Female) was Kareena Kapoor. The superhero film Ra.One was declared Best Marketed Film Of The Year. The film also won the Best Marketed Movie of the Year and the Highest Single-Day Collections awards. Eros International earned the award for Excellence in International Distribution.

2012 
Salman Khan won his third consecutive award for Most Profitable Actor (Male) while Katrina Kaif garnered the Most Profitable Actor (Female) honour. The film Ek Tha Tiger was declared as Top Grossing Film of the Year. Akshay Kumar went on to win for Highest Grossing Actor. Sonakshi Sinha won the Highest Grossing Actress award. Shah Rukh Khan won his second consecutive award for Most Profitable Actor (Overseas).

2013 
Actor Aamir Khan won Highest Grossing Actor (Male) for his 2013 released film Dhoom 3. Deepika Padukone took the award for Highest Grossing Actor (Female) for her films released in 2013.

2014 
Aamir Khan won his 2nd consecutive Highest Grossing Actor (Male) award for the film PK, while Anushka Sharma won Highest Grossing Actor (Female) award for the same film.

2015 
Salman Khan won Highest grossing Actor (Male) award for Bajrangi Bhaijaan and Prem Ratan Dhan Payo. Kareena Kapoor won Highest Grossing Actress (Female) award for Bajrangi Bhaijaan.

2018 
Ranveer Singh took Highest Grossing Actor (Male) award for his two highly successful films Padmaavat and Simmba. Sonam Kapoor took Highest Grossing Actor (Female) award for Veere Di Wedding, Pad Man and Sanju.

2019 
Action Blockbuster War won highest grossing Film of the Year. Akshay Kumar received highest grossing Actor award for Kesari, Mission Mangal, Housefull 4 and Good Newwz while Kiara Advani took highest grossing Actress award for Kabir Singh and Good Newwz.
Prabhas won the Highest Grossing Debut Actor Award for Saaho

Footnotes

References 

Bollywood film awards